The 2019 SLFA Island Cup was an  association football cup competition for the island of Saint Lucia. The tournament began on 2 July 2019 and concluded on 21 December 2019.

Gros Islet won the tournament.

First Group Stage

Standings

Group A 
Group 1
 1.Canaries                 8   7  0  1  19- 7  21  Qualified
 2.Vieux Fort South         8   5  1  2  17-13  16  Qualified
 3.Roseau Valley            8   5  1  2  12- 9  16  Qualified
 4.Gros Islet               8   4  2  2  21-15  14  Qualified
 - - - - - - - - - - - - - - - - - - - - - - - - -
 5.Desruisseaux             8   4  2  2  12- 8  14
 6.Micoud                   8   4  1  3  15-10  13
 7.Laborie                  7   1  0  6  10-15   3
 8.South Castries           7   1  0  6   7-15   3
 9.Mon Repos                8   0  1  7   5-26   1

Group B 
 1.Marchand                 7   4  3  0   9- 4  15  Qualified
 2.Dennery                  7   4  2  1   9- 5  14  Qualified
 3.Central Castries         7   3  3  1  13- 8  12  Qualified
 4.Mabouya Valley           7   3  2  2   8- 5  11  Qualified
 - - - - - - - - - - - - - - - - - - - - - - - - -
 5.Babonneau                7   2  3  2  10- 9  10
 6.La Clery                 7   1  4  2   4- 7   7
 7.Anse-la-Raye             7   0  3  4   6-13   3
 8.Vieux Fort North         7   1  0  6   5-13   3

Results 

[Jul 24]
Canaries                2-0 South Castries
Mon Repos               0-5 Gros Islet
[Jul 25]
Roseau Valley           1-2 Vieux Fort South
La Clery                1-2 Dennery 
[Jul 28]
Micoud                  1-2 Canaries
Desruisseaux            2-1 South Castries
Anse-la-Raye            awd Vieux Fort North        [awarded 0–3, Anse-la-Raye dns]
Babonneau               0-1 Mabouya Valley    
[Aug 1]
La Clery                2-0 Vieux Fort North
Dennery                 1-1 Central Castries
[Aug 4]
Mon Repos               1-3 Desruisseaux 
Marchand                1-0 Vieux Fort North
Gros Islet              1-2 Roseau Valley
[Aug 5]
Anse-la Raye            1-1 Babonneau   
Mabouya Valley          0-0 La Clery
Micoud                  2-1 Laborie
South Castries          1-4 Vieux Fort South
[Aug 8]
Vieux Fort North        0-1 Central Castries
Dennery                 0-0 Marchand
South Castries          3-0 Mon Repos
Canaries                0-3 Desruisseaux
[Aug 11]
Roseau Valley           1-0 Micoud
Gros Islet              3-0 South Castries          [possibly awarded]
Mabouya Valley          5-2 Vieux Fort North
Anse-la-Raye            2-3 Marchand     
[Aug 12]
Desruisseaux            1-0 Laborie 
Vieux Fort South        0-1 Canaries
Babonneau               2-1 Dennery
La Clery                0-4 Central Castries 
[Aug 15]
Roseau Valley           2-1 Desruisseaux            
La Clery                0-0 Marchand
Micoud                  2-1 South Castries
Central Castries        2-2 Anse-la-Raye
[Aug 18]
Gros Islet              1-7 Canaries
Roseau Valley           2-1 South Castries
[Aug 19]
Babonneau               3-0 Vieux Fort North
Mon Repos               0-5 Micud
Dennery                 2-1 Anse-la-Raye
[Aug 22]
Central Castries        4-2 Babonneau
Micoud                  2-2 Gros Islet
Marchand                1-0 Mabouya Valley
Laborie                 awd Roseau Valley           [awarded 0-3]
[Aug 25]
Canaries                3-2 Laborie
Babonneau               1-1 La Clery
[Aug 26]
Vieux Fort South        3-1 Micoud
Gros Islet              1-1 Desruisseaux 
[Aug 29]
Canaries                1-0 Mon Repos   
Dennery                 2-0 Mabouya Valley
[Sep 1]
Mon Repos               1-4 Laborie
Gros Islet              5-1 Vieux Fort South
[Sep 2]
Anse-la-Reye            0-2 Mabouya Valley
Central Castries        1-3 Marchand
[Sep 5]
Mon Repos               1-1 Roseau Valley
Desruisseaux            1-1 Vieux Fort South
[Sep 8]
South Castries          n/p Laborie
[Sep 14]
Vieux Fort South        2-1 Laborie   
 
Final Tables:

Second Group Stage 

Known results
[Oct 27]
Marchand                3-0 Vieux Fort South
Central Castries        2-3 Gros Islet
[Dec 1]
Canaries                0-1 Roseau Valley               
[Dec 8]
Dennery                 1-2 Mabouya Valley
 
Final Table:

 1.Gros Islet               7   5  1  1  15- 9  16  Qualified
 2.Mabouya Valley           7   5  0  2  18-14  15  Qualified
 3.Vieux Fort South         7   4  1  2  22-10  13  Qualified
 4.Marchand                 7   4  1  2  19-10  13  Qualified
 - - - - - - - - - - - - - - - - - - - - - - - - -
 5.Roseau Valley            7   3  1  3   9-11  10
 6.Dennery                  7   1  3  3   7-13   6
 7.Canaries                 7   1  1  5   8-21   4
 8.Central Castries         7   1  0  6   9-19   3

Semifinals 
[Dec 15]
Vieux Fort South        3-0 Mabouya Valley
[Dec 16]
Gros Islet              1-1 Marchand                [4-3 pen]

Third Place Match 

[Dec 21]
Mabouya Valley          awd Marchand                [awarded 3–0, Marchand dns]

Final

References

Saint Lucia
Saint Lucia